Barsbütteler SV is a German association football club from the city of Barsbüttel, Schleswig-Holstein

History
The club was established on 27 October 1948. Part of the membership left to form Willinghuesener Sport-Club in 1958. In addition to fielding a football side the club has departments for aerobics, athletics, badminton, basketball, fitness, gymnastics, Judo, Karate, running, swimming, Taekwon-Do, table tennis, and volleyball.

In 1994, SV won promotion to the Oberliga Hamburg/Schleswig-Holstein (IV) where they competed until the 1996–97 season after which they were sent down following a 13th-place result.

Honours
The club's honours:
 Landesliga Hamburg-Hansa: 1986, 1992, 2003

References

External links

Das deutsche Fußball-Archiv historical German domestic league tables 

Football clubs in Germany
Football clubs in Schleswig-Holstein
1948 establishments in Germany
Association football clubs established in 1948